Thomas Hall (by 1488 – 31 December 1550), of Huntingdon and Coleby, Lincolnshire, was an English politician.

He was a Member (MP) of the Parliament of England for Huntingdon in 1529.

References

15th-century births
1550 deaths
People from Huntingdon
People from the Borough of North Lincolnshire
English MPs 1529–1536